Heinz Bonn (27 January 1941 – November 1991) was a German footballer who played as a defender.

Career
Bonn began his career in the youth team at SuS Niederschelden, before signing for Sportfreunde Siegen. At the age of 22, following Sportfreunde Siegen's relegation from the Oberliga to the Verbandsliga, Bonn signed for second-tier side Wuppertaler SV. In 1970, Bonn signed for Bundesliga club Hamburger SV for a fee of DM 75,000. Bonn only made 13 Bundesliga appearances for Hamburg, with his time at the club being hampered by a meniscus injury that required four operations during his time at the club. In 1973, Bonn signed for 2. Bundesliga club Arminia Bielefeld.

Death and personal life
On 5 December 1991, Bonn's body was found in his apartment in the Hanoverian district of Linden. After last being seen alive in Hannover on 27 November 1991, it was estimated that Bonn, who had been stabbed multiple times, had died a week prior to his body being found. The culprit for Bonn's murder has never been found. 

Bonn's homosexuality was only discovered following his death.

References

1941 births
1991 deaths
Association football defenders
German footballers
Sportspeople from Siegen
Sportfreunde Siegen players
Wuppertaler SV players
Hamburger SV players
Arminia Bielefeld players
Oberliga (football) players
Bundesliga players
2. Bundesliga players
LGBT association football players
Gay sportsmen
German LGBT sportspeople
German murder victims
People murdered in Germany
20th-century German LGBT people
Footballers from North Rhine-Westphalia